is a former Japanese football player and manager. He played for Japan national team.

Club career
Matsuura was born in Yokohama on November 20, 1955. After graduating from Waseda University, he joined Nippon Kokan (later NKK) in 1978. The club won the champions at 1980 JSL Cup and 1981 Emperor's Cup. From 1985, the club won the 2nd place for 3 years in a row and won the champions 1987 JSL Cup. He also became a top scorer in 1986–87 and 1987–88. He retired in 1991.

National team career
On June 2, 1981, Matsuura debuted for Japan national team against China. He played at 1984 Summer Olympics qualification. In 1986, he was selected Japan for the first time in 2 years and also played 1986 Asian Games. In 1987, he played at 1984 Summer Olympics qualification. This qualification was his last game for Japan. He played 22 games and scored 6 goals for Japan until 1987.

Coaching career
After retirement, Matsuura became a manager NKK in 1992. However the club was disbanded end of 1993 season and he resigned.

Club statistics

National team statistics

Personal honors
Japan Soccer League First Division Top Scorer - 1986/87, 1987/88

References

External links

Japan National Football Team Database

1955 births
Living people
Waseda University alumni
Association football people from Kanagawa Prefecture
Japanese footballers
Japan international footballers
Japan Soccer League players
NKK SC players
Japanese football managers
Footballers at the 1986 Asian Games
Association football forwards
Asian Games competitors for Japan